The Yekiti Kurdistan Party – Syria (Previously: Kurdish Yekiti Party in Syria), (Kurdish: Partîya Yekîtîya Kurdistani – Sûrîyê), (Arabic: حزب يكيتي الكردستاني – سوريا). or PYKS is a Kurdish party active in Kurdish areas of Syria, seeking Kurdish federalism in Syria. He is also active in areas and neighborhoods with a Kurdish majority in Syria. Its first constituent conference was held in 2000, where the party's name was (Kurdish Yekiti Party in Syria) from the date of its founding until the party's eighth convention on 23 December 2018, in the city of Qamishli, the party's name was changed to (Yekiti Kurdistan Party – Syria) The party is also a revolutionary party that seeks to find a solution to the "Kurdish issue in Syria" and to defend the rights of the "Kurdish people in Syria" in general, calling for the recognition of Kurds in Syria, in favor of a federal system similar to the Iraqi federal system, within Iraqi Kurdistan independent of the central Iraqi state.

Party Secretaries 
A list of the names of party secretaries since its establishment and until now:

References

2000 establishments in Syria
Federalist parties in Syria
Kurdish political parties in Syria
Political parties established in 2000
Political parties in Syria
Political parties in the Autonomous Administration of North and East Syria